Sintermeertencollege is a comprehensive school in Heerlen, the Netherlands, established in 1967. The school was founded by the Bernardinuscollege as a dependence school for the Bernardinuscollege in Heerlen-west (Welten) Netherlands.

The school expanded in the 1980s with the Clara Mavo (vocational education) and merged with Coriovallum College in 1990.

In 1993 Sintermeertencollege moved to a new premises at Valkenburgerweg 219 in Heerlen, a modern 3 storey building.
Sintermeertencolege specialises in ICT, Arts, Sports, and is part of the ELOS network

Sintermeertencollege is part of SVO│PL together with College Rolduc, Eijkhagencollege, Herlecollege, Praktijkonderwijs Parkstad Limburg, and Bernardinuscollege

External links
 Website from the Sintermeertencollege (in Dutch)
 English information page on the website from the Sintermeertencollege
 Stichting Voortgezet Onderwijs|Parkstad Limburg (SVO│PL)

Educational institutions established in 1967
1967 establishments in the Netherlands
Christian schools in the Netherlands
Secondary schools in the Netherlands
Schools in Limburg (Netherlands)
Buildings and structures in Heerlen